On Tuesday, April 15, 1958, a tornado outbreak produced severe weather over peninsular Florida and part of neighboring Georgia. A total of five tornadoes occurred, the strongest of which was rated F4 in Polk County, Florida, becoming one of only two F4 tornadoes recorded in the U.S. state of Florida, although the rating is disputed. The second F4 tornado occurred on April 4, 1966, in Polk County near Gibsonia and Galloway. In total, 36 people were injured during the 1958 outbreak, but no deaths were directly related to the tornadoes.

Background

Impact

Confirmed tornadoes

Fort Pierce, Florida

The fourth tornado became the most destructive event of the outbreak, touching down near U.S. Route 441 west of Fort Pierce in Saint Lucie County. It moved east through the city's business district and moved offshore over the Atlantic Ocean. A total of 28 homes were demolished or received damage in the Fort Pierce area, while 200 additional buildings were destroyed or damaged as well. In addition, nine small residences were destroyed outside the city. Initial estimates placed damages near $5,000,000 (1958 USD), but these estimates were deemed too high by the General Adjustments Bureau. Final estimates placed damages near "over half million" or $0.5 million. Martial law was declared after the tornado struck the city, but it was lifted on April 16. Grapefruit was tossed from the trees, but growers salvaged the majority of the fruit from the ground. Most of the 20 injuries were inflicted by flying glass in the city's downtown business district.

Non-tornadic effects
One B-47 bomber departing from MacDill Air Force Base was destroyed when it encountered the parent thunderstorm. The plane unsuccessfully attempted to fly at lower altitudes and avoid it. The four crew members aboard were not found and presumed dead.

Aftermath and recovery

See also
List of North American tornadoes and tornado outbreaks

Notes

References

Sources

F4 tornadoes by date
Tornadoes of 1958
Tornadoes in Florida
Tornadoes in Georgia (U.S. state)
1958 natural disasters in the United States
1958 in Florida
1958 in Georgia (U.S. state)
Florida tornado outbreak